The Ferrolterra Pantin Classic is an international surf competition which gathers in a yearly basis all the most remarkable figures in the world of surf, fun, body board and windsurfing at the beach of Pantin in Valdoviño, Ferrolterra, north-western Spain.

Note: From 2006 the Beach of Doniños will be hosting the “European Junior Surfing Championships Doninhos (City of Ferrol)” which will be gathering, on a yearly basis, some of the best surfers from the European Union and the rest of the World.

See also 

 The Galician Upper Rias, Ferrol Region and Province of A Coruña in North-western Spain
 Ferrol, WikiMapia

External links 

  Official website of the Ferrolterra Pantin Classic
  Official Body Board News website
  The Ferrolterra Pantin Classic at SurfersVillage.com
  Surf news of pantín at Pantinsurfcamp.com

Province of A Coruña
Beaches of Galicia (Spain)
Sport in Galicia (Spain)